is a Japanese manga series written and illustrated by Buichi Terasawa in 1987.

Plot
Those who have the blood of the Karasu Tengu (Crow Goblin) in their veins must forever fight against the powers of darkness. Along with four other holy ninja warriors Genbu (Black Snaky Tortoise), Suzaku (Red Phoenix), Seiryu (Blue Dragon), Byakko (White Tiger), Karasu Tengu Kabuto fights against the evil god Kuroyasha (Black Night Demon) Dôki and his underlings such as Junin-shu (Top Ten Warriors). Their battle continues through generations: in the second volume of the manga, Kabuto's son makes an appearance as the second Karasu Tengu.

Media

Manga
The manga has been serialized in Shueisha's Fresh Jump in 1987–1988, and later published in the United States by ComicsOne (as Kabuto in 2001),

Anime
The manga was later adapted into the 39-episode anime series written by Hideki Mitsui and directed by Gen Fukuda and Takashi Watanabe in 1990–1991, premiering on NHK BS-2 on July 29, 1990. There were also six special episodes.

Original video animation
An OVA, Raven Tengu Kabuto: The Golden-Eyed Beast (鴉天狗カブト　黄金の目のケモノ, Karasu Tengu Kabuto: Ôgon no me no Kemono), was released in 1992. It was released in the U.S. on VHS as Kabuto the Golden Eye Monster by US Renditions in 1992.

References

External links
English >> WORKS >>KABUTO -buichi.com (official website)

1986 manga
1990 anime television series debuts
1992 anime OVAs
Fictional ninja
Historical fantasy anime and manga
Japanese mythology in anime and manga
Ninja in anime and manga
Ninja films
Sengoku period in fiction
Shōnen manga
Works about tengu